Mailacompu is a village in Kumaramangalam Panchayath of Idukki district in Kerala state of India. It is located 6 km from Thodupuzha.

References

Villages in Idukki district